Jo and Jo (Jomol & Jomon) is an Indian Malayalam-language comedy film directed by debutant Arun D Jose. The film is co-produced by Imagine Cinemas and Signature Studios. Written by Arun along with Raveesh Nath, the film stars Nikhila Vimal, Mathew Thomas, Naslen K. Gafoor and Melvin G babu in the lead roles. The music for the film is done by Govind Vasantha.

Premise
Jomol is the elder daughter of Baby and Lilly. Their second child is Jomon, and Jomol thinks her parents love him more because he is a male. Jomon is a carefree person and holds certain chauvinistic values to an extent when it comes to the power struggle between him and his sister. Jomol with her keen perceptive skills catches Jomon's every little mischiefs and exposes them to their parents. All of these create a rift between them. Meanwhile, a love letter arrives at their house, and they both think that the letter was meant for the other person, and they both try to unravel the full story behind the letter with evidence, and this forms the story. Parallel plot-lines include Manoj's infatuation on Jomol, Eby's plans to meet his girlfriend Nimmy during second-phase of COVID-19, etc.

Cast
Nikhila Vimal as Jomol Baby
Mathew Thomas as Jomon Baby
Naslen K. Gafoor as Manoj Sundaran
Melvin G Babu as Eby Kuruvilla
Sagar Surya as Tuttu (Parishkaari) 
Johny Antony as Baby Palathara
 Sminu Sijo as Lillykutty Baby
 Leena Antony as Annamma
 Hareesh Pengan as Manoj's elder uncle
 Saniya Babu as Nimmi (Melvin's love interest)
 Santhosh Laxman as Kadakkaran
Sameera Sabu as Indu
 Anjana Ashokan as Jomon's Wedding girl (Ellolam Thari song)
 Binu Adimaly as Member Shibu
 Sreejith Ravi as Sub Inspector  of Police
Kalabhavan Shajohn as Saji, Indhu's father (cameo appearance)

Production
The film was announced in mid-September. Its first look poster was revealed by actor Prithviraj Sukumaran at 16 October on Mathew's Birthday.

Release
The film released on theatres on 13 May 2022.

Home media
The digital rights of the film were acquired by Amazon Prime Video and it started streaming on 10 June 2022.

Music
Music for the film is composed by Govind Vasantha and lyrics are penned by Suhail Koya and Titto Thankachan.

Reception 
The film received positive response from critics. Ottplay gave 3/5 and wrote, "This entertainer about sibling rivalry is arguably the most fun film set in the lockdown". The News Minute gave 2.5/5 and wrote, "Film on sibling rivalry had promise, but failed to deliver". Deepa Soman of Onmanorama wrote, 'all the actors, be it Naslen, Mathew, Nikhila, Johny Antony, Sminu or those doing the supporting characters, have given their all to the wonderfully relatable everyday characters making this movie a safe bet as a weekend watch.'

References

2022 comedy films
Indian comedy films
2020s Malayalam-language films